Daria Sergeyevna Ustinova (born 8 May 1998) is a Russian swimmer. She competed in the 2020 Summer Olympics.

References

1998 births
Living people
Swimmers from Saint Petersburg
Swimmers at the 2020 Summer Olympics
Swimmers at the 2014 Summer Youth Olympics
Russian female freestyle swimmers
Olympic swimmers of Russia